Thylacodes zelandicus is a species of sea snail, a worm snail or worm shell, a marine gastropod mollusc in the family Vermetidae, the worm snails. This species was previously known as Serpulorbis zelandicus.

References

 Powell A. W. B., New Zealand Mollusca, William Collins Publishers Ltd, Auckland, New Zealand 1979 

Vermetidae
Gastropods of New Zealand
Gastropods described in 1834